The Battle of Taftanaz started on February 11, 2012 in Idlib Governorate, between anti-government fighters and Syrian Arab Army troops participating in a nationwide crackdown on dissent against Bashar Assad's government. Heavy fighting took place on the outskirts of the town of Taftanaz, killing 20 people. On the day of the battle Kofi Annan announced a cease-fire for the Syrian conflict.

By 5 April, the military captured Taftanaz's city center, which was defended by 200 armed rebels, after a two-hour battle, following which the army reportedly rounded up and executed 82 people. It was unknown how many were opposition fighters and how many were civilians.

Two months after, it was called a "massacre" in the town of Taftnaz, two-thirds of the population had left. The town had been a centre for opposition protests until the army had raided it with tanks on 3 April. Witnesses in the town said that tanks shelled the town from four sides before armored cars brought in dozens of soldiers who dragged civilians from their homes and gunned them down in the streets, and they also claimed that the soldiers looted, destroyed and torched hundreds of homes, bringing some down on their owners' heads. Videos showed this, and 62 people were killed during the attack, despite the town only having a small rebel presence. Nine Syrian Arab Army tanks were destroyed by homemade bombs as they left the town.

References

External links 
In Cold Blood, Human Rights Watch, 10 April 2012.
They Burned My Heart, Human Rights Watch, 3 May 2012.

Military operations of the Syrian civil war in 2012
Idlib Governorate in the Syrian civil war
Military operations of the Syrian civil war involving the Syrian government
Military operations of the Syrian civil war involving the Free Syrian Army
Battles of the Syrian civil war